Gerrit Hulsman (18 February 1900 – 23 November 1964) was a Dutch footballer. He played in four matches for the Netherlands national football team from 1921 to 1923.

References

External links
 

1900 births
1964 deaths
Dutch footballers
Netherlands international footballers
Place of birth missing
Association footballers not categorized by position